Dehenna Sheridan Davison (born 27 July 1993) is a British Conservative Party politician and broadcaster serving as Parliamentary Under-Secretary of State for Levelling Up since September 2022. She has been the Member of Parliament (MP) for Bishop Auckland since the 2019 general election.

Born in Sheffield, South Yorkshire, Davison attended Sheffield High School. She studied British Politics and Legislative Studies at the University of Hull where she was a National Union of Students (NUS) delegate and led a successful campaign to disaffiliate the university's student union from the NUS. She was the Conservative candidate for Kingston upon Hull North and Sedgefield in the 2015 and 2017 general elections respectively.

Davison was elected as MP for Bishop Auckland in the 2019 general election. She is the first Conservative to represent the constituency since its creation in 1885. The seat had previously been held by Labour for 84 years. After her election, she was considered a "rising star" in the party, and an example of a Conservative representing a red wall constituency. However, in 2022 she announced that she would not stand for the next general election. She supported Liz Truss in her successful campaign to become Prime Minister in September 2022 and subsequently became Parliamentary Under-Secretary of State for Levelling Up. Davison is a classical liberal and supported Brexit.

Early life and education
Dehenna Sheridan Davison was born on 27 July 1993 in Sheffield, South Yorkshire, England, where she grew up on a council estate. Her father was a stonemason, and her mother was a nursery nurse. Davison was educated at the independent Sheffield High School, on a scholarship. When she was 13 years old, her father was attacked and killed, his assailant being imprisoned for manslaughter. Three years later, she represented the family at a criminal injuries compensation tribunal. She has commented in interviews that the experience fostered her interest in politics.

Davison studied British Politics and Legislative Studies at the University of Hull. During her time at the university, she spent a year working as a parliamentary aide for Jacob Rees-Mogg, the MP for North East Somerset. Davison was also a NUS delegate and played for the university's lacrosse team. She led a successful campaign to disaffiliate the university's student union from the NUS in 2016. In the same year, Davison was the Conservative candidate for the Kings Park ward in the Hull City Council election, where she finished last. In 2018, she again contested and finished fifth in the Kingswood ward. 

In her late teens and early twenties, while she was a student, Davison had a variety of jobs, including working in a video games retailer, a casino, a betting shop, and a branch of Pizza Hut.

Prior to becoming an MP, Davison was a research and development analyst for LUMO, a company which advises businesses on tax credits.

Parliamentary career
Davison was selected as the Conservative candidate for the Kingston upon Hull North constituency at the 2015 general election. She finished third behind the Labour Party and UK Independence Party candidates. Davison supported Brexit in the 2016 United Kingdom European Union membership referendum and is a classical liberal. She next contested Sedgefield at the 2017 general election, where she finished second behind the Labour candidate. In the 2019 Conservative Party leadership election, she supported Jeremy Hunt.

She was elected as MP for Bishop Auckland at the 2019 general election, with a majority of 7,962 (17.8%) on a swing of 9.5% from Labour to the Conservatives. Davison was the first Conservative MP for the constituency since its creation in 1885. The seat had been represented by a Labour MP since 1935. Her campaign focused on promises on Brexit, and reopening Bishop Auckland Hospital's emergency department which had been closed in 2009. Since her election, she was considered a "rising star" in the party and a prominent Conservative representing a red wall constituency. She made her maiden speech on 16 January 2020. In that month, she voiced her support for scrapping the planned high-speed railway project HS2, and re-investing the money into local transport schemes. 

On 14 February 2020, it was reported that Davison had been photographed with two far-right activists at a party to celebrate Brexit on 31 January in her constituency. In response, Davison distanced herself from the views of the two men, stating, "These photos were taken at an event open to the public and I in no way whatsoever condone the views highlighted of the individuals concerned." 

Davison was a member of the Home Affairs Select Committee from March 2020 to November 2021. She is also a member of the European Research Group, on the steering committee of the China Research Group, on the board of the Blue Collar Conservatives, and a member of the parliamentary council of the centre-right think tank The Northern Policy Foundation. 

In September 2020, Davison was criticised by her own party after she mocked then Scottish Labour leader Richard Leonard for having an English accent and suggested that this was the reason for Labour's decline in support in Scotland. A spokesman for the Scottish Conservatives said that: "This criticism is unacceptable. It plays into the kind of divisive politics that the SNP promote."

She founded the All-Party Parliamentary Group for One-Punch Assaults in February 2021. Her father died from a one-punch assault when she was 13 years old. She launched the Free Market Forum, a group of Conservative MPs advocating classical liberalism which is affiliated with the Institute of Economic Affairs think tank with Greg Smith in April 2021.

Davison abstained on the vote for the Health and Social Care Levy in September 2021. The levy increased National Insurance Contributions paid by employees and employers by 1.25% between April 2022 and 2023 before becoming a separate tax from then on. She was also one of 99 Conservative MPs to vote against the introduction of Covid passes in England in December 2021. In early 2022, she voiced her support for the reform of the Gender Recognition Act 2004 to include self-identification, and a conversion therapy ban to include transgender people.

Davison was one of 148 MPs to vote against Prime Minister Boris Johnson in the 2022 Conservative Party vote of confidence in his leadership on 6 June. Johnson survived the vote of confidence but subsequently resigned on 7 July 2022 following the Chris Pincher scandal and the subsequent government crisis. She endorsed Liz Truss in the July–September 2022 Conservative Party leadership election.

Truss became Prime Minister on 6 September 2022 and Davison was appointed as Parliamentary Under Secretary of State at the Department for Levelling Up, Housing and Communities two days later. Rishi Sunak succeeded Truss as a result of the October 2022 Conservative Party leadership election and Davison retained her role. 

On 25 November 2022, Davison announced that she would stand down as an MP at the next general election citing the need to have a "life outside of politics" and support her family.

GB News
Davison was a co-host of The Political Correction on GB News on Sunday mornings between June 2021 and September 2022. She earned £1,879.17 per month for this role.

Personal life
In 2018, Davison married John Fareham, a Conservative councillor on Hull City Council, who is 35 years her senior. The couple appeared together on the Channel 4 documentary series Bride and Prejudice, which showed their wedding at the Guildhall, Kingston upon Hull. They separated before the 2019 general election. She lives in the village of Coundon in County Durham. Davison came out as bisexual in 2021. She was the first openly bisexual female Conservative MP. As of February 2022, she is in a relationship with diplomat Tony Kay, the head of the Arabian Peninsula department at the Foreign, Commonwealth and Development Office.

As part of Mental Health Awareness Week 2019, Davison discussed her personal experience of depression and suicidal ideation while working in London as a parliamentary aide, after her grandmother had been diagnosed with, and subsequently died of, lung cancer. She has also been open about her past use of antidepressants.

References

External links

1993 births
Living people
21st-century English women politicians
21st-century English politicians
Alumni of the University of Hull
Conservative Party (UK) MPs for English constituencies
Female members of the Parliament of the United Kingdom for English constituencies
People educated at Sheffield High School, South Yorkshire
People from Coundon
Politicians from Sheffield
GB News newsreaders and journalists
LGBT members of the Parliament of the United Kingdom
English LGBT politicians
UK MPs 2019–present
Bisexual politicians
Bisexual women
21st-century LGBT people
Women government ministers in the United Kingdom